Shonbeh (also Romanized as Shanbeh; also known as Chambeh, Shamba, Shambeh, Shumbeb, and Shumbeh) is a city in Shonbeh and Tasuj District of Dashti County, Bushehr province, Iran. At the 2006 census, its population was 2,414 in 505 households, when it was a village. The following census in 2011 counted 2,528 people in 609 households, by which time Shonbeh was elevated to the status of a city. The latest census in 2016 showed a population of 2,747 people in 760 households.

A strong earthquake measuring 6.1 struck the city of Shonbeh and villages of Shonbeh and Tasuj District on 9 April 2013, killing at least 37 people.

See also

2013 Bushehr earthquake

References 

Cities in Bushehr Province
Populated places in Dashti County